Perjura ("Perjured") is a 1938 Mexican film starring Sara García.

External links
 

1938 films
1930s Spanish-language films
Mexican black-and-white films
Mexican romantic drama films
1938 romantic drama films
1930s Mexican films